Maren Meinert (born 5 August 1973) is a German football coach and former player who played as a midfielder and striker. She was most recently the head coach of Germany women's national under-20 football team.

As a player, Meinert played for German clubs FCR Duisburg and FFC Brauweiler Pulheim, as well as Boston Breakers in the United States. She also represented the Germany women's national football team.

Club career
Meinert was the first player inducted into Boston Breakers' "Pillars of Excellence" during a ceremony held at half-time of the 17 May 2009 game between the Breakers and Washington Freedom.

International career
Meinert played for the German national team between 1991 and 2003, making appearances at three FIFA Women's World Cup finals and the 2000 Summer Olympics.

Germany won the 2003 World Cup. She scored the first goal in the final against Sweden.

International goals

Management career
Meinert coached various German youth national teams for the German Football Association (DFB) from 2005 to 2019. In 2018, the DFB asked Meinert to become head coach of the Germany women's national football team after dismissing Steffi Jones, but she turned down the opportunity for personal reasons. Less than a year later, the DFB surprisingly chose not to extend Meinert's contract.

After her departure from the DFB, Meinert was linked to many high-profile positions, including the head coach position at the Irish national team and the assistant position at the United States national team.

Honours

Playing honours
FC Rumeln-Kaldenhausen
 Hallenmasters: 1995

FCR Duisburg
 Frauen-Bundesliga runners-up: 1997
 DFB-Pokal Frauen: 1998

Germany
 FIFA Women's World Cup
 Winners: 2003
 Runners-up: 1995
 Olympic Games bronze medal: 2000
 UEFA Women's Euro: 1995, 1997, 2001

Individual
 Women's United Soccer Association Most Valuable Player: 2003

Managerial honours
Germany
 FIFA U-20 Women's World Cup
 Winners: 2010, 2014
 Runners-up: 2012
 UEFA Women's Under-19 Championship: 2006, 2007, 2011

Individual
 Felix Coach of the Year: 2010

General honours
 Order of Merit of North Rhine-Westphalia

References

External links
 

1973 births
Living people
German women's footballers
Germany women's international footballers
FCR 2001 Duisburg players
1995 FIFA Women's World Cup players
1999 FIFA Women's World Cup players
2003 FIFA Women's World Cup players
Footballers at the 2000 Summer Olympics
Olympic footballers of Germany
Olympic bronze medalists for Germany
German football managers
Footballers from Duisburg
Expatriate women's soccer players in the United States
Olympic medalists in football
FIFA Women's World Cup-winning players
Medalists at the 2000 Summer Olympics
Women's association football midfielders
German footballers needing infoboxes
UEFA Women's Championship-winning players
Boston Breakers (WUSA) players
Women's United Soccer Association players